The Japanese Federation of Labour ( Nippon Rōdō Kumiai Sōdōmei) was a national trade union federation in Japan.

The federation was established in 1946, principally through the efforts of trade unionists who had been involved in the pre-war Japanese Labour Federation. The new federation aligned itself with the Japan Socialist Party.  By 1948, it claimed a total of 924,302 members, slightly less than its communist rival, Sanbetsu.

In 1950, many affiliates left to join the new General Council of Trade Unions of Japan, and by 1954, membership of Sodomei affiliates had fallen to 240,000.  That year, many of its remaining affiliates split away to join the new All-Japan Trade Union Congress (Zenro), the surviving Sodomei being a small, conservative group with seven affiliates.  In 1964, it merged with Zenro and the National Council of Government and Public Workers' Unions, to form the Japanese Confederation of Labour.

Affiliates
The following unions were affiliated in 1945:

The following unions were later affiliates:

Presidents
1946: Komakichi Matsuoka
1952: Yonekichi Kim
1959: Masashichi Motoi

References

National trade union centers of Japan
Trade unions established in 1946
Trade unions disestablished in 1964
1946 establishments in Japan
1964 disestablishments in Japan